KREI (800 AM) is a radio station licensed to Farmington, Missouri, United States.  The station airs a News-Talk format, and is currently owned by Alpha Media, through licensee Alpha Media Licensee LLC.

References

External links
KREI's webpage

REI
News and talk radio stations in the United States
Alpha Media radio stations